The Voice + is a Brazilian reality talent show which premiered on Rede Globo on January 17, 2021, based on the concept The Voice Brasil. The difference with this version is that only contestants over 60 years old can participate.

The main presenter is André Marques and the backstage presenter is Thalita Rebouças, both already presenters of the children's version of the program. Daniel, Claudia Leitte, Ludmilla and Mumuzinho are the coaches.

For the second season, Fafá de Belém replaced Claudia Leitte, while Daniel, Ludmilla, and Mumuzinho were set to come back. However, due to some scheduling problems with technicians Mumuzinho and Daniel, they had to be replaced by Carlinhos Brown and Toni Garrido. And Thaís Fersoza took the place of Thalita Rebouças in the backstage presentation.

Production
The series is part of The Voice franchise and is based on a similar competition format in the Netherlands, entitled The Voice Senior. The Voice + is a competition aimed at the elderly over 60 years.

The first season was shown on Sundays, in the afternoon, as well as the children's version and the first year of the adult version. There were a total of twelve episodes in that first screening. The program was also shown on the Multishow channel, Mondays, at an alternative time.

Coaches and hosts

Coaches
On October 23, Claudia Leitte, Mumuzinho and Daniel were announced as coaches. The fourth chair would initially be occupied by the rapper Emicida, who ended up leaving the reality afterwards. On October 30, Ludmilla was confirmed as the fourth coach.

On December 16, 2021, Fafá de Belém was announced as a new coach in place of Claudia. Daniel and Mumuzinho had to be replaced by Carlinhos Brown and Toni Garrido in the second season, due to some scheduling issues.

Hosts
In the first season, the program was presented by André Marques, with Thalita Rebouças behind the scenes of the program, interviewing participants, and sending messages to the public. Both were presenters of the children's version of the program since 2017.

Key
 Main host
 Backstage

Series overview

Ratings and reception

References

External links
Official website on Globo.com

The Voice +
Portuguese-language television shows
Rede Globo original programming
Brazilian reality television series
2021 Brazilian television series debuts
Brazilian television series based on Dutch television series